Iain Bain (1934-2018) FSA was a Scottish historian of printing. He worked at Unwin Brothers and then was production manager at Bodley Head and lastly as head of publications at the Tate Gallery. He was president of the Thomas Bewick Society and of the Printing Historical Society. In his youth he was Scottish hammer champion at school and at university.

References 

Fellows of the Society of Antiquaries of London
Historians of printing
Scottish male hammer throwers
20th-century Scottish historians
Tate galleries
1934 births
2018 deaths